Ennetmoos is a municipality in the canton of Nidwalden in Switzerland.

History
Ennetmoos is first mentioned in 1311 or 1315 as Ennetmooss.

The dragon in the municipality's coat of arms is inspired by the legend of Strut von Winkelried, as the home castle of the Winkelrieds of the 13th century has been placed in the municipality's territory.

Geography

Of this area, 47.9% is used for agricultural purposes, while 43.9% is forested. Of the rest of the land, 5.7% is settled (buildings or roads) and the remainder (2.4%) is non-productive (rivers, glaciers or mountains).

It consists of the village of Ennetmoos and the hamlets of St. Jakob, Rohren, Allweg/Grueb and Rotzloch.

Demographics
, 7.7% of the population was made up of foreign nationals. Over the last 10 years the population has grown at a rate of 6.5%. Most of the population speaks German  (94.8%), with Serbo-Croatian being second most common ( 1.4%) and Italian being third ( 1.1%).   the gender distribution of the population was 52.0% male and 48.0% female.

 there are 671 households, of which 364 households (or about 54.2%) contain only one or two individuals.  92 or about 13.7% are large households, with at least five members.

In the 2007 federal election the most popular party was the FDP which received 90% of the vote.  Most of the rest of the votes went to local small right-wing parties (9.3%).

The entire Swiss population is generally well educated.  In Ennetmoos about 72% of the population (between age 25-64) have completed either non-mandatory upper secondary education or additional higher education (either university or a Fachhochschule).

Ennetmoos has an unemployment rate of 0.85%.  , there were 182 people employed in the primary economic sector and about 63 businesses involved in this sector.  376 people are employed in the secondary sector and there are 16 businesses in this sector.  134 people are employed in the tertiary sector, with 33 businesses in this sector.

The historical population is given in the following table:

Sights
The main sights of Ennetmoos are: the church St. Jakob, the chapel St. Leonhard in Rohren, the chapel St. Magnus in Allweg, a monument (Überfalldenkmal) in Allweg, ruins at Rotzberg, the Stanserhorn mountain and resort, and the pilgrimage route St. Jakobsweg.

References

Municipalities of Nidwalden